Bakhmakhi (Dargwa: БахӀмахьи) is a rural locality (a selo) in Nizhnemulebkinsky Selsoviet, Sergokalinsky District, Republic of Dagestan, Russia. The population was 227 as of 2010. There is 1 street.

Geography 
Bakhmakhi is located 27 km southwest of Sergokala (the district's administrative centre) by road. Burkhimakhi and Ullukimakhi are the nearest rural localities.

Nationalities 
Dargins live there.

References 

Rural localities in Sergokalinsky District